Segol (   also known as Segolta, with variant English spellings), is a cantillation mark found in the Torah, Haftarah, and other books of the Hebrew Bible. The Segol occurs together with a preceding Zarka, sometimes with a Munach preceding one or both.

The Segol group is considered to be a disjunctive. It occurs in place of the Katan group or a Zakef gadol. It is the strongest disjunctive group ahead of the Etnachta group.

The Hebrew word סְגוֹל֒ translates into English as bunch, referring to a bunch of grapes. This is reflected in its appearance as a three-dot symbol.

Total occurrences

Melody

References

Cantillation marks